Hedstrom, Hedström and Hedstrøm are surnames of Swedish and Norwegian origin which may refer to:
Åse Hedstrøm
John Maynard Hedstrom
Jonathan Hedström (born 1977), Swedish professional ice hockey player
Lotta Hedström (born 1955), Swedish politician of the Green Party
Ludvig Hedström (born 2001), Swedish professional ice hockey player
Margaret Hedstrom (born 1953), American archivist
Olof Gustaf Hedstrom (1803-1877), Swedish-American minister
Oscar Hedstrom (1871–1960), Swedish-born American motorcycle designer
Øystein Hedstrøm (born 1946), Norwegian politician for the Progress Party
Tina Hedström (1942–1984), Swedish actress
Tuva Moa Matilda Karolina Novotny Hedström
The name of Swedish immigrants in the 19th century to America were often changed to more phonetic friendly variations. One example is the last name "headstream" that is the English counterpart of the Swedish surname "Hedstrom."

Swedish-language surnames
Norwegian-language surnames